Aethes tuxtlana is a species of moth of the family Tortricidae. It was described by Razowski in 1986. It is found in Chiapas, Mexico.

References

tuxtlana
Moths described in 1986
Moths of Central America
Taxa named by Józef Razowski